The 2006–07 season was the 104th in the history of the Southern League, which is an English football competition featuring semi-professional and amateur clubs from the South West, South Central and Midlands of England and South Wales. This season was the first to feature the new Division One sections after reform of the Isthmian League structure.

Premier Division
The Premier Division consisted of 22 clubs, including 16 clubs from the previous season and six new clubs:
Two clubs promoted from the Eastern Division:
Corby Town
Stamford

Two clubs promoted from the Western Division:
Clevedon Town
Hemel Hempstead Town

Plus:
Maidenhead United, relegated from the Conference South
Wealdstone, transferred from the Isthmian League

Bath City won the league and were promoted to the Conference South along with play-off winners Maidenhead United, who returned to the Conference after relegation in 2006. Only Northwood were relegated this season, and the other clubs finished in the relegation zone were reprieved due to Farnborough Town and Scarborough folding, and Hayes merging with Yeading.

League table

Play-offs

Stadia and locations

Division One Midlands
After the end of the previous season, the regional divisions were restructured due to the reorganisation of the Isthmian League. Most of the previous season's Eastern Division clubs were transferred to the Isthmian League. Southern League Eastern and Western divisions were replaced by Division One Midlands and Division One South & West.

Brackley Town won the division and were promoted to the Premier Division along with play-off winners Bromsgrove Rovers. Both clubs that finished in the relegation zone were reprieved, due to clubs folding or resigning from other leagues.

League formation
Division One Midlands consisted of 22 clubs, including 16 clubs from previous season Southern League divisions and six new clubs:

 Clubs relegated from the Premier Division:
 Aylesbury United
 Evesham United
 Clubs from the Western Division:
 Bedworth United
 Brackley Town
 Bromsgrove Rovers
 Cinderford Town
 Dunstable Town
 Leighton Town
 Rushall Olympic
 Solihull Borough
 Stourport Swifts
 Sutton Coldfield Town
 Willenhall Town

 Clubs from the Eastern Division:
 Barton Rovers
 Berkhamsted Town
 Rothwell Town
 Clubs promoted from the Midland Alliance:
 Chasetown
 Malvern Town
 Stourbridge
 Plus:
 Bishop's Cleeve, promoted from the Hellenic League
 Spalding United, transferred from Northern Premier League Division One
 Woodford United, promoted from the United Counties League

League table

Play-offs

Stadia and locations

Division One South & West
After the end of the previous season, the regional divisions were restructured due to the reorganisation of the Isthmian League. Most of the previous season's Eastern Division clubs were transferred to the Isthmian League. Southern League Eastern and Western divisions were replaced by Division One Midlands and Division One South & West.

Bashley won the division and were promoted to the Premier Division along with play-off winners Swindon Supermarine. Hanwell Town and Beaconsfield SYCOB were relegated to the Spartan South Midlands League, while Lymington & New Milton resigned from the league before the next season started.

League formation
Division One South & West consisted of 22 clubs, including nine clubs from previous season Southern League divisions and 13 new clubs:

 Clubs joined from the Western Division:
 Beaconsfield SYCOB
 Bracknell Town
 Burnham
 Marlow
 Paulton Rovers
 Swindon Supermarine
 Taunton Town
 Clubs transferred from Isthmian League Division One:
 Bashley
 Lymington & New Milton
 Newport (Isle of Wight)
 Clubs promoted from the Hellenic League:
 Abingdon United
 Didcot Town

 Clubs promoted from the Spartan South Midlands League:
 Hanwell Town
 Hillingdon Borough
 Oxford City
 Clubs promoted from the Wessex League:
 Andover
 Thatcham Town
 Winchester City
Plus:
 Brook House, promoted from Isthmian League Division Two
 Chesham United, relegated from the Premier Division
 Uxbridge, joined the Eastern Division
 Windsor & Eton, relegated from Isthmian League Premier Division

At the end of the season Brook House changed name to AFC Hayes.

League table

Play-offs

Stadia and locations

League Cup

First round
Clubs playing in the Southern League Premier Division were exempt from the first round. All teams in the two divisions One entered the competition at this stage.

Second round
Cirencester Town and Northwood entered at this stage along with all the clubs who won their first round ties. All other Premier Division clubs were exempt.

Third round
All clubs who had been previously exempt entered at this stage of the competition along with the 12 teams who won their second round fixtures.

Fourth round

Quarter-finals

Semi-finals

Final

See also
Southern Football League
2006–07 Isthmian League
2006–07 Northern Premier League

References

2006-07
7